Doak may refer to:

People 
 Doak (name), a list of people with the surname or given name

Places 
 Doak, West Virginia, United States, an unincorporated community
 Doak Island, Nunavut, Canada
 Doak Historic Site, New Brunswick, Canada

Other uses 
Doak Campbell Stadium, commonly known as the Doak, home to the Florida State Seminoles football team
Doak Field, home to the North Carolina State University Wolfpack baseball team
 Doak VZ-4, American prototype VTOL aircraft built in the 1950s
 Destiny of Ancient Kingdoms,  the first South African free-to-play massively multiplayer online role-playing game

See also 
 Doak–Little House, a historic building in South Strabane Township, Pennsylvania
 Lady Doak College, a women's post-secondary educational institution located in the community of Chinnachokikulum in the city of Madurai, India